The 2013–14 Tennessee Lady Volunteers basketball team represents the University of Tennessee in the 2013–14 college basketball season. The Lady Vols, led by 2nd year head coach Holly Warlick, played their games at Thompson–Boling Arena and are members of the Southeastern Conference.

Roster

Schedule and results

|-
!colspan=9 style="background:#FF9933; color:white;"| Exhibition

|-
!colspan=9 style="background:#FF9933; color:white;"| Regular Season

|-
!colspan=9 style="background:#FF9933;"| 2014 SEC Tournament

|-
!colspan=9 style="background:#FF9933;"| 2014 NCAA Tournament

Rankings

See also
2013–14 Tennessee Volunteers basketball team

References

Tennessee
Tennessee Lady Volunteers basketball seasons
Tennessee
Volunteers
Volunteers